The Warrington College of Business is the business school of the University of Florida.  About 6,300 students are enrolled in classes, including undergraduates and graduate students, including Master of Business Administration and Ph.D.-seeking students. All programs are accredited by the Association to Advance Collegiate Schools of Business.

Leadership
For over three decades John Kraft served as the Dean of the Warrington College of Business.  His tenure as Dean started in 1990, and ended in 2020.
 
In March 2020 Dr. Saby Mitra was named the new Dean of the Warrington College of Business. Dr. Mitra started on August 1, 2020.

Undergraduate programs
Undergraduate programs are offered through the Heavener School of Business (Finance, General Studies, Information Systems, Management, and Marketing.) and the Fisher School of Accounting (Accounting). The Hough Graduate School of Business offers ten options for its MBA degree program (three full-time, three professional, 3 online and executive). One of UF MBA's three Professional options is a satellite program in South Florida at the UF MBA Sunrise Center in Sunrise, Florida.

International programs
International programs in more than 20 countries are offered to undergraduate and graduate students. The Master of International Business is the international graduate program offered. Students in this program may spend six weeks in a foreign country studying a specific industry, country, or global operation issue, but a study of at least one week abroad is required.

Entrepreneurship & Innovation Center
The college is home to the Entrepreneurship & Innovation Center. The center was founded in 2000 with the mission to introduce the concept of entrepreneurship to students and faculty, and offers one of the nation's only Master's of Science degrees in Entrepreneurship.

Hough Graduate School of Business
William R. Hough of St. Petersburg, Florida, founder of the investment firm bearing his name and an alumnus of the college's first MBA class in 1948, donated $30 million to the college in 2007. It was the largest private gift ever received by the University of Florida at that time. The funds established an endowment to support teaching, academic programs, and enhancements in the graduate school of business, and provided a lead gift to construct a new building to house the graduate business programs named after Mr. Hough himself. The gift is also eligible for matching funds from the State of Florida Major Gifts Trust Fund and from the Alec P. Courtelis Facilities Enhancement Challenge Grant Program, potentially increasing the total value of the gift to $50 million.

Warrington College of Business Buildings

Undergraduate rankings
 24th overall by the U.S. News & World Report, 2021
 7th for Real Estate
 10th for Marketing
 11th for Accounting

Graduate rankings
 17th overall for Accounting by the U.S. News & World Report, 2020
 19th overall for Marketing by the U.S. News & World Report, 2020
 35th overall for Finance by the U.S. News & World Report, 2020

Hough Graduate School of Business rankings

Full-time MBA
 25th overall by the U.S. News & World Report, 2020
 21st (Global) The Economist 'WhichMBA' 2018

Part-time MBA
 32nd overall Part-Time MBA by the U.S. News & World Report, 2020

Online MBA
 4th Best Online MBA Program by the U.S. News & World Report, 2020
 5th in Admissions Selectivity by the U.S. News & World Report, 2018
 7th (Global) Online MBA, Financial Times, 2018

Department, schools and programs
Heavener School of Business
Fisher School of Accounting
Hough Graduate School of Business
Department of Finance, Insurance and Real Estate
Department of Information Systems and Operations Management
Department of Management
Department of Marketing
Kelley A. Bergstrom Real Estate Center

Ethics program
The ethics program at the Warrington College of Business is conducted by the Elizabeth B. & William F. Poe, Sr. Center for Business Ethics Education and Research.

See also
List of United States business school rankings
List of business schools in the United States
Bryan Hall at UF
Library West

References

External links

Business schools in Florida
Colleges of the University of Florida
Educational institutions established in 1926
1926 establishments in Florida